Stanley Nibbs BEM (7 June 1914 – 16 January 1985) was an instructor and preacher on the island of Tortola in the British Virgin Islands (BVI). His educational service to the islands was recognized with his awarding of the British Empire Medal in 1968, and, in 1993, by the  issue of a postage stamp, making him one of the first black citizens to appear on a BVI stamp.

Biography 
Stanley Nibbs was born in Tortola in the British Virgin Islands on 7 June 1914. He worked as teacher for the British Virgin Islands first high school, whilst also travelling the islands as a Methodist preacher. He died on 16 January 1985.

For over 50 years, Nibbs was the sole woodworking teacher for the British Virgin Islands Secondary School.

Honours 
In the 1968 New Year Honours, he was awarded the British Empire Medal (BEM) by Queen Eliabeth II in recognition of his civil service.

In 1993 a stamp was made to honour his secondary educational service. This was one of the first instances of BVI stamps honouring its black citizens.

On 21 October 2014, it was announced the Virgin Islands School of Technical Studies (VISTS) would be naming a wing of their school after Stanley Nibbs for his over 50 years of scholarly service to the Virgin Islands.

References 

1914 births
1985 deaths
20th-century Caribbean people
People from Tortola
British Virgin Islands religious leaders
20th-century Methodist ministers
Black British schoolteachers
Recipients of the British Empire Medal
British schoolteachers
British Methodist ministers
20th-century British educators